The 1820 Delaware gubernatorial special election was held on October 3, 1820. The winner of the 1819 gubernatorial election, Henry Molleston, died before assuming office, elevating State Senate Speaker Jacob Stout to the governorship and triggering an election in 1820. However, the election was not just for the remainder of Molleston's term, but instead for a full three-year term.

Jesse Green was the Federalist nominee to succeed Stout and ran against Democratic-Republican nominee John Collins. Collins defeated Green by a slim margin, becoming the first Democratic-Republican Governor of Delaware since 1810. However, Collins died in office on April 16, 1822, triggering another special election in 1822.

General election

Results

References

Bibliography
 
 
 

1820
Delaware
Gubernatorial
Delaware 1820